James Israel Standifer (April 19, 1779 – August 20, 1837) was an American politician who represented Tennessee in the United States House of Representatives.

Biography
Standifer was born on April 19, 1779, in Henry County, son of Israel and Susannah Heard Standifer. He married his cousin, Martha "Patsy" Standifer on February 2, 1801, in Knox County, Tennessee. She was the daughter of William and Jemima Jones Standifer, born January 19, 1783, in Henry County, Virginia, and died June 15, 1848, in Tennessee. He attended the common schools and graduated from the University of Tennessee at Knoxville. He owned slaves.

Career
During the War of 1812, Standifer enlisted as a private, was promoted to captain and served from September 30, 1813, to December 30, 1813. He reenlisted on January 20, 1814, and served under Colonel John Brown in the East Tennessee Volunteer Mounted Gunmen. He was promoted to lieutenant colonel, and served until March 11, 1814.  
  
Standifer was elected to the Eighteenth Congress, representing the 3rd district, which lasted from March 4, 1823, to March 4, 1825. He was also elected as a Jacksonian to the Twenty-first Congress through the Twenty-third Congress, as a White supporter (Anti-Jacksonian) to the Twenty-fourth Congress, and as a Whig to the Twenty-fifth Congress. He served from March 4, 1829, until his death  near Kingston, Tennessee, on his way to Washington, D.C.

When White ran for president in 1836, it split the Democratic Party in Tennessee so badly that the Whigs carried the state in presidential elections for the next twenty years. President Jackson demanded the Tennessee congressional delegation back his vice president, Martin Van Buren of New York, as his successor. From a review of the historical record, it is clear that Congressman James Standifer, who represented the Sequatchie Valley just west of modern Chattanooga, was the chief instigator of the presidential campaign of Hugh Lawson White (see "James Standifer, Sequatchie Valley Congressman," by Steve Byas, Tennessee Historical Quarterly, Summer 1991).

Death
Standifer died near Kingston, Roane County, Tennessee, on August 20, 1837 (age about 55 years) while returning to Washington for a Congressional session. He is interred at Baptist Cemetery, Kingston, Tennessee**. The cause cited for his death was pneumonia.

According to the assistant archivist for Roane County, TN.:
They have death records as far back as 1804 and they have never come across this man or any record of his death. She said that back then, the government would send out a coroner to investigate an official's death to make sure he had not been murdered. Since he was a Congressman, there would have been some record of him being in (or even passing thru) Kingston ~ especially if he died somewhere in Roane county. The Historical Society has recorded almost all the cemeteries in the county and has never come across anything for this man.  She said "it's a story that just won't die". She also stated that there is no record of a "Baptist Cemetery" in Kingston, TN.

While the assistant archivist for Roane County finds no record of his death there, his death was reported in newspapers around the country, and multiple papers listed the death as "near Kingston."

See also
List of United States Congress members who died in office (1790–1899)

References

External links
 

 
James Israel Standifer on Elizabeth's Elders

1779 births
1837 deaths
People from Virginia
American people of English descent
Democratic-Republican Party members of the United States House of Representatives from Tennessee
Jacksonian members of the United States House of Representatives from Tennessee
National Republican Party members of the United States House of Representatives from Tennessee
Whig Party members of the United States House of Representatives from Tennessee
American slave owners
University of Tennessee alumni
American militia officers
American militiamen in the War of 1812
Military personnel from Tennessee